Macromycetozoa is a grouping of Amoebozoa.

References

Amoebozoa